Beach House is the debut studio album by American dream pop duo Beach House. It was released on October 3, 2006, by Carpark Records in North America, Bella Union in Europe, and Mistletone Records in Australia. The album received mostly positive reviews from music critics.

The album had a remastered reissue in 2010 by HeartBreakBeat Records with a run limited to 1,000 copies on black vinyl. In 2012, a pressing on special edition white vinyl was released through Bella Union. In 2015, the band self-released a white cassette during the Depression Cherry tour. As of April 2012 Beach House has sold 24,000 copies in United States according to Nielsen Soundscan.

The album was recorded on a 4-track over a two-day period in Scally's basement.

Composition 
The album has been described as an indie pop record with "shoegazer textures". Almost Cool said the band created an album of "lo-fi, hazy summer dream pop". The opening track, "Saltwater", is a lazy, drifting song built on scratchy, low-key synthetic beats that got "flooded with softly spreading guitar distortion and incandescent organ". "Master Of None" has a "more radiant synths and dreamy guitar rolling out over a slightly funkier rhythm." "Auburn And Ivory" is a siren-song of 60's psychedelia and classical influences that's a duller, more stoney take on The Rolling Stones' "Play With Fire". "Childhood" is "the most upbeat song on the album, and it's one of the warmest."

Critical reception 
The album received mostly positive reviews from music critics. At Metacritic, which assigns a normalized rating out of 100 to reviews from mainstream critics, the album received an average score of 73, based on 14 reviews, indicating "generally favorable reviews". Pitchfork said the album evoked a "recipe of fairground waltzes, ghosted lullabies, and woodland hymnals" and compared the work of the duo to Mazzy Star, Spiritualized and Slowdive. AllMusic said the album is "one of the most mystical indie-pop surprises to arrive in 2006." Giving the album a positive review, LAS Magazine said the album was "made for gray days indoors or late August afternoons spent lying in golden fields staring at blue skies," while comparing it to Yo La Tengo's album And Then Nothing Turned Itself Inside-Out. Almost Cool said "it sounds like a late summer album, but it's just dark enough that I bet it will sound nice looking out the window to a dusting of snow on the ground as well." Dusted Magazine said it is "a dream of an album." Delusions of Adequacy said the album "is the perfect accompaniment for an introspective day, or night, of watching the globules of a lava lamp slowly float and sink."

Accolades 
The album was included at number sixteen in Pitchforks list of the top 50 albums of 2006.

Controversy 
The band adapted "Snowdon Song" by 1970s folk group Tony, Caro and John, changing the key, the time signature, and the lyrics and renaming it "Lovelier Girl" with the trio given no attribution. Four years after the album's release, the trio contacted them. After amicable discussions on copyright, the authorship of the "Lovelier Girl" version of the song is now jointly attributed to Beach House and Tony Doré of the trio."So we settled everything with them and they're fine and we're fine. We made sure all the necessary royalties go to them and all that stuff, and they're in the index as the co-writers," Scally says. "We had no idea on our first record that's how that thing worked. You don't know anything when you're just kids in a basement making a record."

In popular culture 
The song "Master of None" was sampled by Canadian singer The Weeknd for his song "The Party & The After Party" off his 2011 debut mixtape House of Balloons. The song was also used in the Netflix show of the same name, as well as featuring in Miranda July's 2011 German-American drama film The Future.

Track listing

Personnel
Beach House
Victoria Legrand
Alex Scally
Production
Rob Girardi – recording, mixing
Adam Cooke – recording
Rusty Santos – mastering
Liz Flyntz – photography

References

2006 debut albums
Beach House albums
Carpark Records albums